Master of the legend of St. Ursula may refer to:
Master of the Legend of Saint Ursula (Bruges)
Master of the Legend of St. Ursula (Cologne)